James Morrisroe (5 April 1875 – 31 December 1937) was an Irish politician from Charlestown, County Mayo. He was elected to Dáil Éireann as a Cumann na nGaedheal Teachta Dála (TD) for the Mayo North constituency at the 1933 general election. Morrisroe held the seat for one Dáil session, until he was defeated at the 1937 general election. Morrisroe also served on the Swinford Board of Guardians and the Swinford District Council. His brother, Rev. Dr. Patrick Morrisroe, served as the Bishop of Achonry.

References

1875 births
1937 deaths
Cumann na nGaedheal TDs
Fine Gael TDs
Members of the 8th Dáil
Politicians from County Mayo